Tambotalo, or Biliru, is a nearly extinct Oceanic language spoken in a single village in the southeast of Espiritu Santo Island in Vanuatu.

References

Espiritu Santo languages
Languages of Vanuatu
Severely endangered languages